Falling Off the Sky is an album by the dB's, released on June 12, 2012, on Bar/None Records. It is the first album of new material released by the band since 1987.

Critical reception

Falling Off the Sky received generally favorable reviews from critics; according to review aggregator website Metacritic, it has a score of 73 out of 100 based on 17 reviews, indicating "generally favorable reviews". Among the most favorable reviews was one written by Robert Christgau, who gave the album an A−. In his review, Christgau described the lead track, "That Time Is Gone", as "as rousing as anything in their [Holsapple and Stamey's] book." A more mixed review by Stephen Deusner stated that on the album, the dB's "don't redefine themselves as defiantly as they once did".

Track listing

References

2012 albums
Bar/None Records albums
The dB's albums